Kenneth Elmer (born 24 April 1948) is a Canadian middle-distance runner. He competed in the men's 1500 metres at the 1972 Summer Olympics.

References

1948 births
Living people
Athletes (track and field) at the 1972 Summer Olympics
Athletes (track and field) at the 1974 British Commonwealth Games
Commonwealth Games competitors for Canada
Canadian male middle-distance runners
Olympic track and field athletes of Canada
Athletes (track and field) at the 1975 Pan American Games
Pan American Games track and field athletes for Canada
Athletes from Vancouver